Victor Backman is a Swedish professional ice hockey forward who is currently playing for GCK Lions of the Swiss League.

Playing career
In 2007 Backman represented Göteborg 1 in TV-pucken, scoring two goals and six assist in eight games.

Backman scored his first Elitserien goal on December 26, 2011, against Joakim Lundström of Timrå IK. He scored his second goal on the game winning shot in the shootout of the same game which ended in a 2–1 win for Frölunda.

Career statistics

Regular season and playoffs

References

External links

1991 births
Living people
Borås HC players
Frölunda HC players
IK Oskarshamn players
Stjernen Hockey players
People from Öckerö Municipality
Swedish ice hockey forwards
Swedish expatriate ice hockey players in Finland
Swedish expatriate ice hockey players in Denmark
Sportspeople from Västra Götaland County